Walter John Stanley O'Connell (29 April 1883 – 5 January 1921) was an Australian rules footballer who played with Richmond in the Victorian Football League (VFL).

Notes

External links 

1883 births
1921 deaths
Australian rules footballers from Victoria (Australia)
Richmond Football Club players